Joanna So (born September 7, 1999) is a Hong Kong figure skater. She is the 2021 Asian Open Trophy bronze medalist and the 2021 Hong Kong national champion. She has competed in the final segment at two Four Continents Championships (2018, 2019).

Programs

Competitive highlights 
CS: Challenger Series; JGP: Junior Grand Prix

References

External links 
 
 

1999 births
Living people
Hong Kong female single skaters
Competitors at the 2019 Winter Universiade
Competitors at the 2023 Winter World University Games
Figure skaters at the 2017 Asian Winter Games